Rhens is a municipality  in the district Mayen-Koblenz, in Rhineland-Palatinate, Germany. It is situated on the left bank of the Rhine, approx. 10 km south of Koblenz.

Rhens was the seat of the former Verbandsgemeinde ("collective municipality") Rhens, which merged into Rhein-Mosel in 2014.

Twinnings
 Bramley, United Kingdom.

References

Mayen-Koblenz
Middle Rhine